Daniel Langhamer (born 20 March 2003) is a Czech footballer who currently plays as a midfielder for Vlašim, on loan from Mladá Boleslav.

Career statistics

Club

Notes

References

2003 births
Living people
Czech footballers
Czech Republic youth international footballers
Association football midfielders
Bohemian Football League players
Czech First League players
Czech National Football League players
SK Slavia Prague players
FK Mladá Boleslav players
1. FK Příbram players
FC Sellier & Bellot Vlašim players